Dongala Bandi is a 2008 Indian Telugu-language comedy film directed by Satish Vegesna and starring Allari Naresh and newcomer Tanya.

Cast 

Allari Naresh as Krish
 Tanya as Aishwarya
Malishka
Ali as Tantia Tope / Tribal leader
Venu Madhav as Pinakapani / Don Amrutapani
Brahmanandam
Jaya Prakash Reddy
Master Bharath
M. S. Narayana as Okka Magaadu
Geetu Singh
Chitram Seenu
Jai Venu
Kovai Sarala as Aishwarya's sister
Rao Ramesh
Jeeva
Shankar Melkote
Kondavalasa
Krishna Bhagavaan
Rajitha
Fish Venkat
Gundu Sudarshan
Suman Setty
Shakeela
Puja Bharati

Production 
Allari Naresh plays a thief after Gamyam and Blade Babji. This is the debut film of director Satish Vegesna. The film was shot in nature.

Soundtrack 
Music is composed by Rajasekhar Valluri. The lyrics are written by Suddala Ashok Teja, Abhinaya Srinvas, and Surisetty Rama Rao.

Release 
The Times of India gave the film a rating of two out of five stars and called the film "a misadventure". The Hindu opined that "Dongala Bandi succeeds in keeping Allari Naresh's fans and comedy genre lovers faithfully entertained and involved". Idlebrain wrote that "On a whole, Allari Naresh's Dongala Bandi disappoints big time". 123 Telugu wrote that "Dongala Bandi entertains in fits and spurts and is an average movie". Full Hyderabad stated that "Watch Dongala Bandi if you are an Allari Naresh fan, but it will most likely cure you".

References

External links 

Indian comedy films